The Terra Sancta Church (  which means Holy Land Church), also alternatively Church of St. Francis, is the name given to one of the two Franciscan-run Roman Catholic churches located in the Old City of Acre in northern Israel, the other one being the Church of St. John the Baptist.

History
According to historical documents of Acre, since the thirteenth century the Franciscans gave great importance to the city. They believed that the founder of the Order, St. Francis of Assisi, visited the city between 1219 and 1220. In 1217 the first Franciscan monastery, founded by Father Elia Da Cortona was built.

After the 1291 conquest of the city by Muslims, the Franciscans had to leave Acre only to return in 1620. The Terra Sancta Church was established in 1673.

Location and description
The Terra Sancta Church was established in 1673. It is located in the centre of Acre's Old City, north of the caravansary known as Khan el-Faranj.

The church is recognisable by the red spire of its Gothic tower, whose colour distinguishes it from other towers and minarets.

See also
Roman Catholicism in Israel
St. John Baptist Church, Acre

References

Roman Catholic churches in Israel
Buildings and structures in Acre, Israel
Roman Catholic churches completed in 1673
1673 establishments in the Ottoman Empire
17th-century Roman Catholic church buildings